Haworth High School is a public, four year high school serving Haworth, Oklahoma and surrounding communities. The school's mascot is the lion and the school colors are green and white.

Athletics
Basketball
Track
Cross-Country
Golf
Baseball
Softball
Cheerleading

Organizations and Clubs
 FCA
 FCCLA
 FFA
 4-H
 Student Council
 Drama Club
 Spanish Club
 Heart-n-Soul (Jr. High Select Show Choir)
 Sunrays (High School Select Show Choir)
 Indian Club
 Yearbook
 Newspaper
 Art Club
 Quiz Bowl

Campus
The Haworth High School is located in the same complex as the middle school and elementary school.

External links
 Haworth Public School

Public high schools in Oklahoma
Schools in McCurtain County, Oklahoma